Kubaryiellus is a genus of small air-breathing land snails, terrestrial pulmonate gastropod mollusks in the family Charopidae.

Species
Species within the genus Kubaryiellus include:
 Kubaryiellus kubaryi

References

 Nomenclator Zoologicus info

 
Charopidae
Taxonomy articles created by Polbot